Orthophytum grossiorum is a plant species in the genus Orthophytum. This species is endemic to Brazil.

References

grossiorum
Flora of Brazil